The Baird of Bute Society recognizes and promotes the historical achievements of Andrew Blain Baird, the Bute blacksmith who on 17 September 1910, at Ettrick Bay on Bute, flew a plane of his own design and manufacture to record the First All-Scottish Heavier-than-air Powered Flight.

The Baird of Bute Society is focused on the advancement of education and information related to Andrew Blain Baird and his aviation and entrepreneurial activity and uses his inspirational example to inspire the youth of Scotland to aspire to greatness in their own lives. The Society strongly participates in the advancement of the arts, heritage, culture and science on the Isle of Bute and beyond.

What We Do

The Society employs the example of Andrew Baird to inspire the youth of Scotland to aspire to achievement in their own lives, through a series of inspiring programmes, scholarships and activities, including:

 The Scottish Aviation Award 
 The Scottish Innovation Award
 Canadian Science Scholarship
 Leitch Space Scholarship
 Baird of Bute Aviation Day
 Lord Smith of Kelvin Lecture
 Scottish Young Achiever Award
 Inspiring Science Programme
 In-School Programmes
 Publishing articles.

Trustees

 Christopher Richard Markwell, Founder & Chair
 Prof. Eleanor Campbell FRS, Trustee & Vice-Chair
 Prof. Michael Russell MSP, Trustee
 Prof. Iain Gray CBE FRSE, Trustee
 Prof. Dugald Cameron OBE, DSc, DA, Trustee
 Craig Clark MBE, Trustee
 Isobel Strong, Trustee
 Joshua McFadden, Trustee
 J. S. Thom CA, Independent Examiner of Accounts

Patron
 Sir Stephen John Hillier KCB, CBE, DFC, ADC, MA

Awards

Baird of Bute Scottish Aviation Award

Baird of Bute Scottish Innovation Award

Scholarships

Baird of Bute Canadian Science Scholarship

This unique  two week Canadian Science Scholarship provides for up to three young people, from across Scotland, the opportunity to acquire experiences and skills to allow each to better succeed in their upcoming university studies. Centred in Toronto, the hands on "Bench to Bedside" programme is supported by University of Toronto, Ontario Science Centre, University Health Network, the Scottish Government and mentored by Cancer researcher Professor Patrick Gunning and bio-ethicist Professor Hazel Markwell.

Scottish Young Achiever Award
Awarded on occasion to recognise a young Scot who, through their unique  achievements, has brought honour to themselves and Scotland and by their example, inspires others to aspire to achievement in their lives.

William Leitch Space Scholarship
Named in honour of the 19th century Bute born scientist and clergyman, Dr. William Leitch, now credited as first to publish the theory that travel in space  was best undertaken with jet propulsion - decades before those earlier credited. Each year one graduate of the Strathclyde University Scottish Space School is selected to spend an internship at Scotland's own Clyde Space, one of the world's foremost manufacturers of cube satellites.

Lectures & Programmes

Lord Smith of Kelvin Lecture
This lecture is an annual open event with a Scottish perspective of interest on aviation and innovation topics delivered at University of Strathclyde in Glasgow by noted Scots who have previously been recipients of a Baird of Bute Society Scottish Award. It was established by the Society and the University to honour Lord Smith of Kelvin who was inaugural Patron of the Society and is Chancellor of the University.

Inspiring Science Programme
A unique visiting school programme presented in cooperation with Edinburgh University and led by Baird Society Vice Chair Professor Eleanor Campbell who is Chair of Chemistry at the university. She and a team of staff and graduate students visit secondary schools, in exurban communities, to discuss new scientific research, demonstrates chemistry in action and give students hands on experience and an opportunity to interact with the team on what studying science at the university level is like. Its STEM based outreach often extends into the participating  local community with mini science fairs and parent involvement.

Events

Annual Baird of Bute Festival of Flight
The annual "Baird of Bute Festival of Flight" takes place during the third weekend of September.

Baird Society's Tenth Anniversary Celebrations

As part of the 2019 Baird Awards and Celebration weekend, the Society was honoured to be joined by Scotland's First Minister Rt. Honourable Nicola Sturgeon at a Civic Reception in the Ilse of Bute Discovery Centre, honouring the tenth anniversary of Baird of Bute, where she said

Publications

References

External links
  The Baird of Bute Website
   The Baird of Bute Society Website

Isle of Bute
Charities based in Scotland
Organisations based in Argyll and Bute